Lieutenant-General Robert Stephenson Smyth Lord Baden-Powell Of Gillwell, 1st Baron Baden-Powell of Gilwell,  (22 February 1857 – 8 January 1941) was a British Army officer, writer, founder and first Chief Scout of the world-wide Scout Movement, and founder, with his sister Agnes, of the world-wide Girl Guide / Girl Scout Movement. Baden-Powell authored the first editions of the seminal work Scouting for Boys, which was an inspiration for the Scout Movement.

Educated at Charterhouse School, Baden-Powell served in the British Army from 1876 until 1910 in India and Africa. In 1899, during the Second Boer War in South Africa, Baden-Powell successfully defended the town in the Siege of Mafeking. Several of his books, written for military reconnaissance and scout training in his African years, were also read by boys. In August 1907, he held a demonstration camp, the Brownsea Island Scout camp, which is now seen as the beginning of Scouting. Based on his earlier books, particularly Aids to Scouting, he wrote Scouting for Boys, published in 1908 by Sir Arthur Pearson, for boy readership. In 1910 Baden-Powell retired from the army and formed The Scout Association.

The first Scout Rally was held at The Crystal Palace in 1909. Girls in Scout uniform attended, telling Baden-Powell that they were the "Girl Scouts". In 1910, Baden-Powell and his sister Agnes Baden-Powell started the Girl Guide and Girl Scout organisation. In 1912 he married Olave St Clair Soames. He gave guidance to the Scout and Girl Guide movements until retiring in 1937. Baden-Powell lived his last years in Nyeri, Kenya, where he died and was buried in 1941.  His grave is a national monument.

Early life 
Baden-Powell was a son of Baden Powell, Savilian Professor of Geometry at Oxford University and Church of England priest, and his third wife, Henrietta Grace Smyth, eldest daughter of Admiral William Henry Smyth. After Baden Powell died in 1860, his widow, to identify her children with her late husband's fame, and to set her own children apart from their half-siblings and cousins, styled the family name Baden-Powell. The name was eventually legally changed by Royal Licence on 30 April 1902.

The family of Baden-Powell's father originated in Suffolk. His mother's earliest known Smyth ancestor was a Royalist American colonist; her mother's father Thomas Warington was the British Consul in Naples around 1800.

Baden-Powell was born as Robert Stephenson Smyth Powell at 6 Stanhope Street (now 11 Stanhope Terrace), Paddington, London, on 22 February 1857. He was called Stephe (pronounced "Stevie") by his family. He was named after his godfather, Robert Stephenson, the railway and civil engineer, and his third name was his mother's surname.

Baden-Powell had four older half-siblings from the second of his father's two previous marriages, and was the fifth surviving child of his father's third marriage:
 Warington (1847–1921)
 George (1847–1898)
 Augustus ("Gus") (1849–1863), who was often ill and died young
 Francis ("Frank") (1850–1933)
 Henrietta Smyth, 28 October 1851 – 9 March 1854
 John Penrose Smyth, 21 December 1852 – 14 December 1855
 Jessie Smyth 25 November 1855 – 24 July 1856
 B–P (22 February 1857 – 8 January 1941)
 Agnes (1858–1945)
 Baden (1860–1937)
The three children immediately preceding B–P had all died very young before he was born.

Baden-Powell's father died when he was three. Subsequently, Baden-Powell was raised by his mother, a strong woman who was determined that her children would succeed. In 1933 he said of her "The whole secret of my getting on, lay with my mother."

He attended Rose Hill School, Tunbridge Wells and was given a scholarship to Charterhouse, a prestigious public school named after the ancient Carthusian monastery buildings it occupied in the City of London. However while he was a pupil there, the school moved out to new purpose-built premises in the countryside near Godalming in Surrey. He played the piano and violin, was an ambidextrous artist, and enjoyed acting. Holidays were spent on yachting or canoeing expeditions with his brothers. Baden-Powell's first introduction to Scouting skills was through stalking and cooking game while avoiding teachers in the nearby woods, which were strictly out-of-bounds.

Military career 

In 1876 Baden-Powell joined the 13th Hussars in India with the rank of lieutenant. In 1880 he was charged with the task of drawing maps of the Battle of Maiwand. He enhanced and honed his military scouting skills amidst the Zulu in the early 1880s in the Natal Province of South Africa, where his regiment had been posted, and where he was Mentioned in Dispatches. Baden-Powell's skills impressed his superiors and in 1890 he was brevetted Major as Military Secretary and senior Aide-de-camp to the Commander-in-Chief and Governor of Malta, his uncle General Sir Henry Augustus Smyth. He was posted to Malta for three years, also working as intelligence officer for the Mediterranean for the Director of Military Intelligence. He frequently travelled disguised as a butterfly collector, incorporating plans of military installations into his drawings of butterfly wings. In 1884 he published Reconnaissance and Scouting.

Baden-Powell returned to Africa in 1896, and served in the Second Matabele War, in the expedition to relieve British South Africa Company personnel under siege in Bulawayo. This was a formative experience for him not only because he commanded reconnaissance missions into enemy territory in the Matopos Hills, but because many of his later Boy Scout ideas took hold here. It was during this campaign that he first met and befriended the American scout Frederick Russell Burnham, who introduced Baden-Powell to stories of the American Old West and woodcraft (i.e., Scoutcraft), and here that he was introduced for the first time to the Montana Peaked version of a western cowboy hat, of which Stetson was a prolific manufacturer, and which also came to be known as a campaign hat and the many versatile and practical uses of a neckerchief.

Baden-Powell was accused of illegally executing a prisoner of war in 1896, the Matabele chief Uwini, who had been promised his life would be spared if he surrendered. Uwini was sentenced to be shot by firing squad by a military court, a sentence Baden-Powell confirmed. Baden-Powell was cleared by a military court of inquiry but the colonial civil authorities wanted a civil investigation and trial. Baden-Powell later claimed he was "released without a stain on my character".

After Rhodesia, Baden-Powell served in the Fourth Ashanti War in Gold Coast. In 1897, at the age of 40, he was brevetted colonel (the youngest colonel in the British Army) and given command of the 5th Dragoon Guards in India. A few years later he wrote a small manual, entitled Aids to Scouting, a summary of lectures he had given on the subject of military scouting, much of it a written explanation of the lessons he had learned from Burnham, to help train recruits.

Baden-Powell returned to South Africa before the Second Boer War. Although instructed to maintain a mobile mounted force on the frontier with the Boer Republics, Baden-Powell amassed stores and established a garrison at Mafeking. The subsequent Siege of Mafeking lasted 217 days. Although Baden-Powell could have destroyed his stores and had sufficient forces to break out throughout much of the siege, especially since the Boers lacked adequate artillery to shell the town or its forces, he remained in the town to the point of his intended mounted soldiers eating their horses. The town had been surrounded by a Boer army, at times in excess of 8,000 men.

The siege of the small town received much attention from both the Boers and international media because Lord Edward Cecil, the son of the British Prime Minister, was besieged in the town. The garrison held out until relieved, in part thanks to cunning deceptions, many devised by Baden-Powell. Fake minefields were planted and his soldiers pretended to avoid non-existent barbed wire while moving between trenches. Baden-Powell did much reconnaissance work himself. In one instance, noting that the Boers had not removed the rail line, Baden-Powell loaded an armoured locomotive with sharpshooters and sent it down the rails into the heart of the Boer encampment and back again in a successful attack.

A contrary view expressed by historian Thomas Pakenham of Baden-Powell's actions during the siege argued that his success in resisting the Boers was secured at the expense of the lives of the native African soldiers and civilians, including members of his own African garrison. Pakenham claimed that Baden-Powell drastically reduced the rations to the native garrison. However, in 2001, after subsequent research, Pakenham changed this view.

During the siege, the Mafeking Cadet Corps of white boys below fighting age stood guard, carried messages, assisted in hospitals and so on, freeing grown men to fight. Baden-Powell did not form the Cadet Corps himself, and there is no evidence that he took much notice of them during the Siege. However, he was sufficiently impressed with both their courage and the equanimity with which they performed their tasks to use them later as an object lesson in the first chapter of Scouting for Boys.

The siege was lifted on 17 May 1900. Baden-Powell was promoted to major-general and became a national hero. However, British military commanders were more critical of his performance and even less impressed with his subsequent choices to again allow himself to be besieged. Ultimately, his failure to understand properly the situation, and abandonment of the soldiers, mostly Australians and Rhodesians, at the Battle of Elands River Pakenham claimed led to his being removed from action.

Briefly back in the United Kingdom in October 1901, Baden-Powell was invited to visit King Edward VII at Balmoral, the monarch's Scottish retreat, and personally invested as Companion of the Order of the Bath (CB).

Baden-Powell was given the role of organising the South African Constabulary, a colonial police force, but during this phase, Baden-Powell was sent to Britain on sick leave, so he was only in command for seven months.

Baden-Powell returned to England to take up the post of Inspector-General of Cavalry in 1903. While holding this position, he was instrumental in reforming reconnaissance training in British cavalry, giving the force an important advantage in scouting ability over continental rivals. Also during this appointment, Baden-Powell selected the location of Catterick Garrison to replace Richmond Castle which was then the Headquarters of the Northumbrian Division. Baden-Powell was a career cavalryman, but realised that cavalry was no match against the machine gun; however, his superiors, Kitchener and French were also career cavalrymen, and still regarded the cavalry as indispensable, with the result that cavalry was used in the First World War with little effect, yet the major item exported from Britain to Flanders during the War was horse fodder.

In 1907 Baden-Powell was promoted to Lieutenant-General but was on the inactive list - possibly at his request, for this was when the Scout Movement was starting to "move", and Baden-Powell had his experimental camp on Brownsea Island (see below).

In October 1907 Baden-Powell was appointed to the command of the Northumbrian Division of the newly formed Territorial Army.

On 19 February 1909 Baden-Powell sailed in the SS Aragon via Portugal and Spain to South America, for what seems to have been just a holiday, a trip not related to either the Army nor to Scouting. However, the Foreign Intelligence section in the Belfast Newsletter reported that when in March 1909 he visited Santiago de Chile for three days, "He was given a warmer reception than had ever been afforded a foreigner in South America."   He sailed back in the RMS Danube by 1 May 1909.

In 1910, aged 53, Baden-Powell retired from the Army. One account has it that Lord Kitchener said that he "could lay his hand on several competent divisional generals but could find no one who could carry on the invaluable work of the Boy Scouts". Baden-Powell wrote that this came from the King, which seems more likely, as the King had introduced the King's Scout Award in 1909 and Army officers held a Commission signed by the King, while Kitchener had nothing to do with the Scout Movement.

In 1915, Baden-Powell's book "My Adventures as a Spy" was published, which was interpreted as indicating that he had been active as a spy during that war.

Scouting movement 

On his return from Africa in 1903, Baden-Powell found that his military training manual, Aids to Scouting, had become a best-seller, and was being used by teachers and youth organisations, including Charlotte Mason's House of Education. Following his involvement in the Boys' Brigade as a Brigade Vice-president and Officer in charge of its scouting section, with encouragement from his friend, William Alexander Smith, Baden-Powell decided to re-write Aids to Scouting to suit a youth readership. In August 1907 he held a camp on Brownsea Island to test out his ideas. About twenty boys attended: eight from local Boys' Brigade companies, and about twelve public school boys, mostly sons of his friends.

Baden-Powell was also influenced by Ernest Thompson Seton, who founded the Woodcraft Indians. Seton gave Baden-Powell a copy of his book The Birch Bark Roll of the Woodcraft Indians and they met in 1906. The first book on the Scout Movement, Baden-Powell's Scouting for Boys was published in six instalments in 1908, and has sold approximately 150 million copies as the fourth best-selling book of the 20th century.

Boys and girls spontaneously formed Scout troops and the Scouting Movement started spontaneously, first as a national, and soon an international phenomenon. A rally of Scouts was held at Crystal Palace in London in 1909, at which Baden-Powell met some of the first Girl Scouts. The Girl Guides were subsequently formed in 1910 under the auspices of Baden-Powell's sister, Agnes Baden-Powell. In 1912, Baden-Powell started a world tour with a voyage to the Caribbean. Another passenger was Juliette Gordon Low, an American who had been running a Guide Company in Scotland, and was returning to the U.S.A. Baden-Powell encouraged her to found the Girl Scouts of the USA.

In 1929, during the 3rd World Scout Jamboree, he received as a present a new 20-horsepower Rolls-Royce car (chassis number GVO-40, registration OU 2938) and an Eccles Caravan. This combination well served the Baden-Powells in their further travels around Europe. The caravan was nicknamed Eccles and is now on display at Gilwell Park. The car, nicknamed Jam Roll, was sold after his death by Olave Baden-Powell in 1945. Jam Roll and Eccles were reunited at Gilwell for the 21st World Scout Jamboree in 2007. It has been purchased on behalf of Scouting and is owned by a charity, B–P Jam Roll Ltd. Funds are being raised to repay the loan that was used to purchase the car.

Baden-Powell also had a positive impact on improvements in youth education. Under his dedicated command the world Scouting Movement grew. By 1922 there were more than a million Scouts in 32 countries; by 1939 the number of Scouts was in excess of 3.3 million.

Some early Scouting "Thanks Badges" (from 1911) and the Scouting "Medal of Merit" badge had a swastika symbol on them. This was undoubtedly influenced by the use by Rudyard Kipling of the swastika on the jacket of his published books, including Kim, which was used by Baden-Powell as a basis for the Wolf Cub branch of the Scouting Movement. The swastika had been a symbol for luck in India long before being adopted by the Nazi Party in 1920, and when Nazi use of the swastika became more widespread, the Scouts stopped using it.

Nazi Germany banned Scouting, a competitor to the Hitler Youth, in June 1934, seeing it as "a haven for young men opposed to the new State". Based on the regime's view of Scouting as a dangerous espionage organisation, Baden-Powell's name was included in "The Black Book", a 1940 secret list of people to be detained following the planned conquest of the United Kingdom. Baden-Powell himself never knew about the list or his inclusion in it because the list was only made public in 1945, shortly after the defeat of the Nazis, and Baden-Powell died in 1941. A drawing by Baden-Powell depicts Scouts assisting refugees fleeing from the Nazis and Hitler. Tim Jeal, author of the biography Baden-Powell, gives his opinion that "Baden-Powell's distrust of communism led to his implicit support, through naïveté, of fascism", an opinion based on two of B-P's diary entries. Baden-Powell met Benito Mussolini on 2 March 1933, and in his diary described him as "small, stout, human and genial. Told me about Balilla, and workmen's outdoor recreations which he imposed though 'moral force'". On 17 October 1939, Baden-Powell wrote in his diary: "Lay up all day. Read Mein Kampf. A wonderful book, with good ideas on education, health, propaganda, organisation etc. – and ideals which Hitler does not practice himself."

At the 5th World Scout Jamboree in 1937, Baden-Powell gave his farewell to Scouting, and retired from public Scouting life. 22 February, the joint birthday of Robert and Olave Baden-Powell, continues to be marked as Founder's Day by Scouts and World Thinking Day by Guides to remember and celebrate the work of the Chief Scout and Chief Guide of the World.

In his final letter to the Scouts, Baden-Powell wrote:
I have had a most happy life and I want each one of you to have a happy life too. I believe that God put us in this jolly world to be happy and enjoy life. Happiness does not come from being rich, nor merely being successful in your career, nor by self-indulgence. One step towards happiness is to make yourself healthy and strong while you are a boy, so that you can be useful and so you can enjoy life when you are a man. Nature study will show you how full of beautiful and wonderful things God has made the world for you to enjoy. Be contented with what you have got and make the best of it. Look on the bright side of things instead of the gloomy one. But the real way to get happiness is by giving out happiness to other people. Try and leave this world a little better than you found it and when your turn comes to die, you can die happy in feeling that at any rate you have not wasted your time but have done your best. "Be prepared" in this way, to live happy and to die happy – stick to your Scout Promise always – even after you have ceased to be a boy – and God help you to do it.

Baden-Powell died on 8 January 1941: his grave is in St Peter's Cemetery in Nyeri, Kenya. His gravestone bears a circle with a dot in the centre "ʘ", which is the trail sign for "Going home", or "I have gone home". His wife Olave moved back to England in 1942, although after she died in 1977, her ashes were taken to Kenya by her grandson Robert and interred beside her husband. In 2001 the Kenyan government declared Baden-Powell's grave a National Monument.

Writings and publications 

Baden-Powell published books and other texts during his years of military service both to finance his life and to generally educate his men.
 1884: Reconnaissance and Scouting
 1885: Cavalry Instruction
 1889: Pigsticking or Hoghunting
 1896: The Downfall of Prempeh
 1897: The Matabele Campaign
 1899: Aids to Scouting for N.-C.Os and Men
 1900: Sport in War
 1901: Notes and Instructions for the South African Constabulary
 1907: Sketches in Mafeking and East Africa
 1910: British Discipline, Essay 32 of Essays on Duty and Discipline
 1914: Quick Training for War

Baden-Powell was regarded as an excellent storyteller. During his whole life he told "ripping yarns" to audiences. After having published Scouting for Boys, Baden-Powell kept on writing more handbooks and educative materials for all Scouts, as well as directives for Scout Leaders. In his later years, he also wrote about the Scout movement and his ideas for its future. He spent most of the last two years of his life in Africa, and many of his later books had African themes.

 1908: Scouting for Boys
 1909: The Scout Library No.4 Scouting Games
 1909: Yarns for Boy Scouts
 1912: The Handbook for the Girl Guides or How Girls Can Help to Build Up the Empire (co-authored with Agnes Baden-Powell)
 1913: Boy Scouts Beyond The Sea: My World Tour
 1915: Indian Memories (American title Memories of India)
 1915: My Adventures as a Spy
 1916: Young Knights of the Empire: Their Code, and Further Scout Yarns
 1916: The Wolf Cub's Handbook
 1918: Girl Guiding
 1919: Aids To Scoutmastership
 1921: What Scouts Can Do: More Yarns
 1921: An Old Wolf's Favourites
 1922: Rovering to Success
 1927: Life's Snags and How to Meet Them
 1927: South African Tour 1926-7
 1929: Scouting and Youth Movements
 est 1929: Last Message to Scouts
 1932: He-who-sees-in-the-dark; the Boys' Story of Frederick Burnham, the American Scout
 1933: Lessons From the Varsity of Life
 1934: Adventures and Accidents
 1935: Scouting Round the World
 1936: Adventuring to Manhood
 1937: African Adventures
 1938: Birds and Beasts of Africa
 1939: Paddle Your Own Canoe
 1940: More Sketches Of Kenya

Most of his books (the American editions) are available online.

Compilations and excerpts comprised:
 
 
 
 

Baden-Powell also contributed to various other books, either with an introduction or foreword, or being quoted by the author,
 1905: Ambidexterity by John Jackson
 1930: Fifty years against the stream: The story of a school in Kashmir, 1880–1930 by E.D. Tyndale-Biscoe about the Tyndale Biscoe School

A comprehensive bibliography of his original works has been published by Biblioteca Frati Minori Cappuccini.

Art
Baden-Powell's father often sketched caricatures of those present at meetings, while his maternal grandmother was also artistic.  Baden-Powell painted or sketched almost every day of his life. Most of his works have a humorous or informative character. His books are scattered with his pen-and-ink sketches, frequently whimsical.  He did a large unknown number of pen-and-ink sketches; he always travelled with a sketchpad that he used frequently for pencil sketches and "cartoons" for later water-colour paintings.  He also created a few sculptures. There is no catalogue of his works, many of which appear in his books, and twelve paintings hang in the British Scout Headquarters at Gilwell Park. There was an exhibition of his work at the Willmer House Museum, Farnham, Surrey, from 11 April – 12 May 1967; a text-only catalogue was produced.

Personal life 

In January 1912, Baden-Powell was en route to New York on a Scouting World Tour, on the ocean liner , when he met Olave St Clair Soames. She was 23, while he was 55; they shared the same birthday, 22 February. They became engaged in September of the same year, causing a media sensation due to Baden-Powell's fame. To avoid press intrusion, they married in private on 30 October 1912, at St Peter's Church in Parkstone. 100,000 Scouts had each donated a penny (1d) to buy Baden-Powell a wedding gift, a 20 h.p. Standard motor-car (not the Rolls-Royce they were presented with in 1929). There is a display about their marriage inside St Peter's Church, Parkstone.

The couple lived in Pax Hill near Bentley, Hampshire, from about 1919 until 1939. The Bentley house was a gift from her father. After they married, Baden-Powell began to suffer persistent headaches which were considered by his doctor to be psychosomatic, and which were treated with dream analysis.

In 1939, they moved to a cottage he had commissioned in Nyeri, Kenya, near Mount Kenya, where he had previously been to recuperate. The small one-room house, which he named Paxtu, was located on the grounds of the Outspan Hotel, owned by Eric Sherbrooke Walker, Baden-Powell's first private secretary and one of the first Scout inspectors. Walker also owned the Treetops Hotel, approximately 10 miles (17 km) out in the Aberdare Mountains, often visited by Baden-Powell and people of the Happy Valley set. The Paxtu cottage is integrated into the Outspan Hotel buildings and serves as a small Scouting museum.

When Olave's sister Auriol Davidson (née Soames) died in 1919, Olave and Robert took her three daughters into their family and brought them up as their own children.

Three of Baden-Powell's many biographers comment on his sexuality; the first two (in 1979 and 1986) focused on his relationship with his close friend Kenneth McLaren. Tim Jeal's later (1989) biography discusses the relationship and finds no evidence that this friendship was of an erotic nature. Jeal then examines Baden-Powell's views on women, his appreciation of the male form, his military relationships, and his marriage, concluding that, in his personal opinion, Baden-Powell was a repressed homosexual. Jeal's arguments and conclusion are dismissed by Procter and Block (2009) as "amateur psychoanalysis", for which there is no physical evidence.

Commissions and promotions

 Commissioned sub-lieutenant, 13th Hussars, 11 September 1876 (retroactively granted the rank of lieutenant from the same date on 17 September 1878)
 Captain, 13th Hussars, 16 May 1883
 Brevet major, British Army, 1890
 Major, 13th Hussars, 1 July 1892
 Brevet lieutenant colonel, British Army, 25 March 1896
 Lieutenant colonel, 13th Hussars, 25 April 1897
 Brevet colonel, British Army, 8 May 1897
 Commanding officer, 5th Dragoon Guards, 1897
 Major general, 23 May 1900
 Inspector General of Cavalry, British Army
 Lieutenant general, 10 June 1907

Recognition

In 1937 Baden-Powell was appointed to the Order of Merit, one of the most exclusive awards in the British honours system, and he was also awarded 28 decorations by foreign states, including the Grand Officer of the Portuguese Order of Christ, the Grand Commander of the Greek Order of the Redeemer (1920), the Commander of the French Légion d'honneur (1925), the First Class of the Hungarian Order of Merit (1929), the Grand Cross of the Order of the Dannebrog of Denmark, the Grand Cross of the Order of the White Lion, the Grand Cross of the Order of the Phoenix, and the Order of Polonia Restituta.

The Silver Wolf Award was originally worn by Robert Baden-Powell. The Bronze Wolf Award, the only distinction of the World Organization of the Scout Movement, awarded by the World Scout Committee for exceptional services to world Scouting, was first awarded to Baden-Powell by a unanimous decision of the then International Committee on the day of the institution of the Bronze Wolf in Stockholm in 1935. He was also the first recipient of the Silver Buffalo Award in 1926, the highest award conferred by the Boy Scouts of America.

In 1927, at the Swedish National Jamboree he was awarded by the Österreichischer Pfadfinderbund with the "Großes Dankabzeichen des ÖPB. In 1931 Baden-Powell received the highest award of the First Austrian Republic (Großes Ehrenzeichen der Republik am Bande) out of the hands of President Wilhelm Miklas. Baden-Powell was also one of the first and few recipients of the Goldene Gemse, the highest award conferred by the Österreichischer Pfadfinderbund.

In 1931, Major Frederick Russell Burnham dedicated Mount Baden-Powell in California to his old Scouting friend from forty years before. Today, their friendship is honoured in perpetuity with the dedication of the adjoining peak, Mount Burnham.

Baden-Powell was nominated for the Nobel Peace Prize on numerous occasions, including 10 separate nominations in 1928. He was awarded the Wateler Peace Prize in 1937. In 2002, Baden-Powell was named 13th in the BBC's list of the 100 Greatest Britons following a UK-wide vote. As part of the Scouting 2007 Centenary, Nepal renamed Urkema Peak to Baden-Powell Peak.

In June 2020, following the George Floyd protests in Britain and the removal of the statue of Edward Colston in Bristol, the Bournemouth, Christchurch and Poole Council (BCP Council) announced that a statue of Baden-Powell on Poole Quay would be removed temporarily for its protection, amid fears for its safety. Police believed it was on a list of monuments to be destroyed or removed, and that it was a target for protestors due to perceptions that Baden-Powell had held homophobic and racist views. The statue had been installed by BCP Council in 2008.

Following opposition to its removal, including from local residents, and past and present scouts, some of whom camped nearby to ensure it stayed in place, BCP Council had the statue boarded up instead. Mark Howell, deputy leader of BCP Council was quoted as saying, "It is our intention that the boarding is removed at the earliest, safe opportunity."

Honours – United Kingdom

Honours – Other countries

Arms

Cultural depictions
 Actor Ron Moody portrays Baden-Powell in the 1972–1973 miniseries The Edwardians.

See also 

 Baden-Powell's unilens
 Scouting memorials

Notes

Further reading

External links 

 
 
 

1857 births
1941 deaths
19th-century British writers
20th-century British writers
19th-century British Army personnel
20th-century British Army personnel
People from Paddington
People educated at Charterhouse School
Scouting pioneers
Chief Scouts (The Scout Association)
Chief Guides
Recipients of the Bronze Wolf Award
British Army lieutenant generals
13th Hussars officers
British spies
British military personnel of the Fourth Anglo-Ashanti War
British Army personnel of the Second Boer War
People of the Second Matabele War
Pre–World War I spies
Outdoor educators
English Anglicans
Barons Baden-Powell
Deputy Lieutenants of Hampshire
Knights Commander of the Order of the Bath
Knights Grand Cross of the Order of St Michael and St George
Knights Grand Cross of the Royal Victorian Order
Knights of Grace of the Order of St John
Members of the Order of Merit
Grand Officers of the Order of Christ (Portugal)
Commandeurs of the Légion d'honneur
Grand Crosses of the Order of the Phoenix (Greece)
Commanders with Star of the Order of Polonia Restituta
Recipients of the Order of Merit of the Republic of Hungary
People of the Victorian era
5th Dragoon Guards officers
Grand Crosses of the Order of the Dannebrog
Grand Crosses of the Order of the White Lion
Knights Grand Cross of the Order of Orange-Nassau
Robert
British Kenya people
Barons created by George V
British memoirists
People from Bentley, Hampshire
Military personnel from London